Lucas Matías Licht (born 6 April 1981) is an Argentine professional footballer who plays for Club Atlético Villa San Carlos mainly as a left-back but also as a left winger.

Club career
Born in Rosario, Santa Fe, Licht grew up in the youth academy of Club de Gimnasia y Esgrima La Plata, starting as a midfielder and making his professional debut in 2001. For three years, Israeli club Maccabi Haifa F.C. had him on the club's transfer shortlist due to his Jewish heritage, as he would not count as a foreigner; he eventually joined Maccabi Netanya F.C. for a trial, but they decided not to offer him a contract.

After one more trial in Israel, with Hapoel Ironi Kiryat Shmona FC, Licht returned to Argentina where he played one last season with Gimnasia. In 2006's Clausura, he struck from 40 meters to score the game's only goal away against Club Atlético Independiente.

On 17 July 2006, Licht joined La Liga side Getafe CF, signing a four-year contract. In his first season he only appeared in eight games as a backup to Javier Paredes but, as the latter joined Real Zaragoza, he became the undisputed starter; on 22 December 2007, he scored his first goal for the Madrid outskirts team in a 2–0 win at UD Almería, adding eight appearances in their quarter-final run in the UEFA Cup.

On 13 December 2009, after having been deemed surplus to requirements by manager Míchel – he did not make the list of 18 in the vast majority of the official matches – Licht was released and returned to his country, penning a three-year deal with Racing Club de Avellaneda.

See also
List of select Jewish football (association; soccer) players

References

External links

1981 births
Living people
Argentine people of German-Jewish descent
Argentine Jews
Jewish Argentine sportspeople
Argentine footballers
Jewish footballers
Footballers from Rosario, Santa Fe
Association football defenders
Argentine Primera División players
Club de Gimnasia y Esgrima La Plata footballers
Racing Club de Avellaneda footballers
Club Atlético Villa San Carlos footballers
La Liga players
Getafe CF footballers
Argentine expatriate footballers
Expatriate footballers in Spain
Argentine expatriate sportspeople in Spain